George Siao Kian Ty ( 18 October 1932 – 23 November 2018) was a Filipino banker and business magnate. He founded Metropolitan Bank and Trust Company, the second largest bank in both assets and capital in the Philippines. He owned stakes in Federal Land, Inc., the Bank of the Philippine Islands and Philippine Savings Bank, a Metrobank subsidiary. Ty was the owner of the G.T. International Tower in Makati.

Biography 
Ty had been a senior advisor of Philippine Savings Bank from April 2008 until his death in 2018. Ty served as an advisor of First Metro Investment Corporation and Philippine AXA Life Insurance Corporation. He served as an advisor of Philippine Savings Bank from April 2006 to April 2008. Ty was the founder of Metropolitan Bank and Trust Company (MBTC). He founded and served as the general manager of Wellington Flour Mills. He has been the honorary chairman of First Metro Travel, Inc. from 1989 until his death in 2018. He served as honorary chairman of Thomas Cook (Philippines) Inc., and FMIC. Ty serves as chairman emeritus of GT Capital Holdings Inc. and served as its chairman since its inception from July 2007 to July 11, 2011. Dr. Ty had been chairman of Toyota Motor Philippines Corporation since 1988. He served as chairman of Global Business Holdings, Inc., and Manila Medical Services, Inc. He had been chairman of Metrobank Foundation, Inc., from 1979 to his death in 2018.

Ty had been chairman of Metrobank Group from 2006 to his death in 2018. He had been chairman of the Advisory Board of First Metro International Investment Co., Ltd since 2002. He served as chairman of the board of Global Business Bank Inc. He served as chairman of the board of Mla. He served as chairman of Toyota Autoparts Philippines Corp. from 1990 to July 2005. Ty served as chairman of Metropolitan Metropolitan Bank & Trust Company from 1975 to 2006 and also served as its co-chairman since May 2006. He had been director of Manila Doctors Hospital from 1979 to his death and GT Capital Holdings Inc. from May 14, 2013 to his death. He served as a director of Metrobank Group, San Miguel Corp., Maynilad Water Services and Metropolitan Bank & Trust Company. He served as a director of Toyota Autoparts Philippines Corporation. He served as a non-executive director of Lai Fai International Holdings Ltd. from September 14, 2002 to his death. Ty graduated from the University of Santo Tomas.

References

1932 births
2018 deaths
Deaths from cancer in the Philippines
Deaths from pancreatic cancer
Filipino bankers
Filipino billionaires
Filipino chief executives
Filipino company founders
Filipino people of Chinese descent
Grand Crosses of the Order of Lakandula
Hong Kong business executives
Hong Kong emigrants to the Philippines
Naturalized citizens of the Philippines
People from Manila
University of Santo Tomas alumni